2R may refer to:

 A standard consumer print size for photographs. See Standard photographic print sizes
 2R (group), a music group
 2R hypothesis, a hypothesis in genomics and molecular evolution
 Yaesu VX-2R, an ultra-compact amateur radio transceiver
 Via Rail, IATA code

See also
R2 (disambiguation)